The 1928 All-Ireland Minor Hurling Championship was the first staging of the All-Ireland Minor Hurling Championship. The championship began on 20 May 1928 and ended on 27 October 1929.

Cork won the title following a 7-6 to 4-0 victory over Dublin in a second replay of the final.

Teams

Team summaries

Results

Leinster Minor Hurling Championship

Munster Minor Hurling Championship

All-Ireland Minor Hurling Championship

External links
 All-Ireland Minor Hurling Championship: Roll Of Honour

Minor
All-Ireland Minor Hurling Championship